The 2013 Seguros Bolívar Open Barranquilla was a professional tennis tournament played on clay courts. It was the third edition of the tournament which was part of the 2013 ATP Challenger Tour. It took place in Barranquilla, Colombia between 8 and 14 April 2013.

Singles main draw entrants

Seeds

 1 Rankings are as of April 1, 2013.

Other entrants
The following players received wildcards into the singles main draw:
  Felipe Escobar
  Marcel Felder
  Felipe Mantilla
  Eduardo Struvay

The following player received entry using a protected ranking:
  Víctor Estrella

The following players received entry from the qualifying draw:
  Iván Endara
  Claudio Grassi
  Cristóbal Saavedra-Corvalán
  Juan Carlos Sáez

Doubles main draw entrants

Seeds

1 Rankings as of April 1, 2013.

Other entrants
The following pairs received wildcards into the doubles main draw:
  Nicolás Barrientos /  Eduardo Struvay
  Jhan Fontalvo Silva /  Francisco Franco
  Felipe Escobar /  Felipe Mantilla

Champions

Singles

 Federico Delbonis def.  Facundo Bagnis, 6–3, 6–2

Doubles

 Facundo Bagnis /  Federico Delbonis def.  Fabiano de Paula /  Stefano Ianni, 6–3, 7–5

External links
Official Website

Seguros Bolivar Open Barranquilla
Seguros Bolívar Open Barranquilla
2013 in Colombian tennis